1692 Subbotina, provisional designation , is a dark background asteroid from the central region of the asteroid belt, approximately  in diameter. The carbonaceous Cg-type asteroid has a rotation period of 9.2 hours. It was discovered by Grigory Neujmin at the Crimean Simeiz Observatory in 1936, and later named after Soviet mathematician and astronomer Mikhail Subbotin.

Discovery 

Subbotina was discovered by Soviet-Russian astronomer Grigory Neujmin at the Crimean Simeiz Observatory on 16 August 1936. On the following night, astronomer Karl Reinmuth independently discovered the body at the Heidelberg Observatory in Germany. Its first used observation was made at Heidelberg in July 1931, extending the body's observation arc by 5 years prior to its official discovery observation in 1936.

Naming 

This minor planet was named in memory of eminent Soviet mathematician and astronomer, Mikhail Subbotin (1893–1966), long-time director of the Institute of Theoretical Astronomy (ITA) in former Leningrad. The lunar crater Subbotin was also named in his honour. The official  was published by the Minor Planet Center on 1 June 1967.

Orbit and classification 

Subbotina is a non-family asteroid from the main belt's background population. It orbits the Sun in the central asteroid belt at a distance of 2.4–3.2 AU once every 4 years and 8 months (1,700 days; semi-major axis of 2.79 AU). Its orbit has an eccentricity of 0.14 and an inclination of 2° with respect to the ecliptic.

Physical characteristics 

In the SMASS-II taxonomy, Subbotina has been characterized as a dark Cg-type, a subtype of the wider group of carbonaceous C-type asteroids with low albedos.

Rotation period 

In October 2006, a rotational lightcurve of Subbotina was obtained from photometric observations by Italian Silvano Casulli and French Laurent Bernasconi, both amateur astronomers. Somewhat higher amplitudes of 0.42 and 0.62 magnitude were found by the NEOWISE mission.

Diameter and albedo 

According to the space-based surveys carried out by the Infrared Astronomical Satellite IRAS, the Japanese Akari satellite, and NASA's Wide-field Infrared Survey Explorer with its subsequent NEOWISE mission, Subbotina measures between 34.8 and 43.0 kilometers in diameter and its surface has a notably low albedo in the range of 0.02 to 0.049. The Collaborative Asteroid Lightcurve Link derives an albedo of 0.04 and a diameter of 36.5 kilometers with an absolute magnitude of 11.3.

References

External links 
 Laurent Bernasconi – astronomy homepage
 Asteroid Lightcurve Database (LCDB), query form (info )
 Dictionary of Minor Planet Names, Google books
 Asteroids and comets rotation curves, CdR – Observatoire de Genève, Raoul Behrend
 Discovery Circumstances: Numbered Minor Planets (1)-(5000) – Minor Planet Center
 
 

001692
Discoveries by Grigory Neujmin
Named minor planets
001692
19360816